Australia participated in the Junior Eurovision Song Contest 2018 in Minsk, Belarus. The Australian broadcaster ABC was responsible for choosing their entry for the contest. Jael was internally selected to represent Australia in Belarus.

Background

In , Alexa Curtis represented Australia with the song "We Are", achieving fifth place. In 2017, Isabella Clarke represented Australia with her song "Speak Up" , achieving third place.

Before Junior Eurovision
On 1 September 2018, it was announced that Jael had been internally chosen by the broadcaster to represent Australia.

Artist and song information

Jael
Jael Wena (born 22 December 2005) is an Australian singer of Congolese descent who represented Australia at the Junior Eurovision Song Contest 2018 with the song "Champion", finishing third.

In 2019, she competed in the season 9 of Australia's Got Talent, and in 2022, she took part in season 11 of Australian edition of The Voice.

Champion
"Champion" is a song by Australian singer Jael. It represented Australia at the Junior Eurovision Song Contest 2018.

At Junior Eurovision
During the opening ceremony and the running order draw which both took place on 19 November 2018, Australia was drawn to perform twelfth on 25 November 2018, following Italy and preceding Georgia.

Voting

Detailed voting results

References

Junior Eurovision Song Contest
Australia
Junior